Agheshlu (also Romanized as Āgheshlū and Agheshloo; also known as  Āgheshlī, Akishli, Akyshly, Āq Ashlū, and Āqeshlū) is a village in Valdian Rural District, Ivughli District, Khoy County, West Azerbaijan Province, Iran. At the 2006 census, its population was 673, in 129 families.

References 

Tageo

Populated places in Khoy County